The 6th constituency of the Loiret (French: Sixième circonscription du Loiret) is a French legislative constituency in the Loiret département. Like the other 576 French constituencies, it elects one MP using a two round electoral system.

Description

The 6th Constituency of the Loiret was created as a result of the 2010 redistricting of French legislative constituencies. The seat includes the eastern parts of Orléans as well as a large part of the rural centre of the department.

This constituency was the only one in Loiret to elect a left wing candidate at the 2012 election before opting for the centrist MoDem as part of the Emmanuel Macron supporting coalition in 2017.

Assembly Members

Election results

2022

 
 
 
 
|-
| colspan="8" bgcolor="#E9E9E9"|
|-

2017

 
 
 
 
 
|-
| colspan="8" bgcolor="#E9E9E9"|
|-

2012

 
 
 
 
 
 
|-
| colspan="8" bgcolor="#E9E9E9"|
|-

References

6